The women's 400 metre freestyle competition of the swimming events at the 2013 Mediterranean Games took place on June 21 at the Mersin Olympic Swimming Pool in Mersin, Turkey.

This race consisted of eight lengths of the pool in freestyle.

Records
Prior to this competition, the existing world and Mediterranean Games records were as follows:

Results
All times are in minutes and seconds.

Heats

Final

References

Swimming at the 2013 Mediterranean Games
2013 in women's swimming